Earl R. Kooi (1917–2003) was an American biochemist best known for being the first to make high fructose corn syrup in 1957 with his partner Richard O. Marshall at the Oklahoma Agricultural Experiment Station. They first discovered how to use the glucose isomerase enzyme to convert glucose to fructose while working at the Corn Products Company. They patented the process in 1960.

See also
High maltose corn syrup
High fructose corn syrup and health

References

Further reading

External links
 Not only Sugar is Sweet, article in FDA Consumer published in 1991

1917 births
2003 deaths
American biochemists
20th-century American engineers
20th-century American inventors